Nikolaj Markussen (born 1 August 1988) is a Danish handballer for TTH Holstebro and the Danish national team.

He is also a european champion with the national team, after winning the 2012 Championship in Serbia, defeating the host nation in the final, 21–19.

Clubs
On 19 February, Markussen signed a two-year deal with Bjerringbro-Silkeborg, starting in the 2015–2016 season.

Honours
Danish Championship:
: 2016

References

External links

1988 births
Living people
Danish male handball players
Liga ASOBAL players
Handball players at the 2012 Summer Olympics
Olympic handball players of Denmark
Expatriate handball players
Danish expatriate sportspeople in Qatar
Danish expatriate sportspeople in Spain
People from Gribskov Municipality
Sportspeople from the Capital Region of Denmark